The Sleeping Lion is a 1919 American silent Western film directed by Rupert Julian and starring Monroe Salisbury, Pat Moore and Rhea Mitchell.

Synopsis
An Italian American from New York heads West to start a new life, but soon makes enemies in the small town he settles in.

Cast
 Monroe Salisbury as Tony 
 Pat Moore as Little Tony 
 Rhea Mitchell as Kate Billings 
 Herschel Mayall as Durant 
 Alfred Allen as Col. Doharney 
 Alice Claire Elliott as Carlotta 
 Marian Skinner as Her Mother 
 Sidney Franklin as Her Father

References

Bibliography
 Langman, Larry. American Film Cycles: The Silent Era. Greenwood Publishing, 1998.

External links
 

1917 films
1917 Western (genre) films
American black-and-white films
Films directed by Rupert Julian
Universal Pictures films
Silent American Western (genre) films
1910s English-language films
1910s American films